Petroleum is an unincorporated community in Nottingham Township, Wells County, in the U.S. state of Indiana.

History
Petroleum was platted in 1894, and is so named because it was laid out in an oil field. The post office at Petroleum has been in operation since 1894.

Geography

References

Unincorporated communities in Wells County, Indiana
Unincorporated communities in Indiana
Fort Wayne, IN Metropolitan Statistical Area